"Little Man" is a song by Sia. It was released in the United Kingdom and Ireland in September 2000 as the second single from her album, Healing Is Difficult (2001). "Little Man" was produced by UK garage artist Wookie (under the alias Exemen) and was a popular club hit in 2000. The song debuted and peaked at number 82 in the United Kingdom.

In an interview in 2014, Sia spoke of her admiration for Amy Winehouse and said Amy covered the song at the Chateau Marmont and told Sia, "That's one of my favourite songs."

Music
"Little Man" is set in the key of E minor.

Impact and legacy
In November 2016, UK duo Gorgon City compiled a list of their top UK garage songs for Billboard, with "Little Man (Exemen Remix)" at #4.

In May 2019, The Guardian listed the Exemen remix of "Little Man" at number 10 in their list of "The best UK garage tracks - ranked!".

In September 2019, NME included the remix in their "25 essential UK garage anthems" list.

Capital Xtra included the remix in their list of "The Best Old-School Garage Anthems of All Time".

Track listings
CD 1
 "Little Man" (2002 mix) – 3:22
 "Little Man" (Exemen Works) – 5:01
 "Little Man" (Exemen Dub) – 5:02
 "Little Man" (Sean's Brother Works) – 4:51

CD 2
 "Little Man" (2002 mix) – 3:22
 "Little Man" (Sam's original demo) – 4:26
 Enhanced video

Charts

Cover versions

 Amy Winehouse
 Delilah in 2011

References

2000 singles
2000 songs
Sia (musician) songs
Songs written by Sia (musician)
Trip hop songs
Downtempo songs
UK garage songs